Nils Rickard Jörgen Moberg (born 2 June 1971) is a Swedish former professional footballer who played as a defender. He represented Sweden at the 1992 Summer Olympics. Moberg played for Swedish domestic clubs Örgryte IS, Östers IF, and Ljungskile SK.

References

External links 
 
 
 Profile at Eurosport

1971 births
Living people
Association football defenders
Swedish footballers
Östers IF players
Örgryte IS players
Ljungskile SK players
Sweden international footballers
Sweden youth international footballers
Footballers at the 1992 Summer Olympics
Olympic footballers of Sweden